The 2021–22 season was the 64th season in the existence of FC Arsenal Tula, the club's 19th and final consecutive season in the top flight of Russian football. In addition to the domestic league, FC Arsenal Tula participated in this season's editions of the Russian Cup, they was eliminated in round of 16.

Squad

Out on loan

Transfers

In

Loans in

Out

Loans out

Released

Friendlies

Competitions

Overview

Premier League

League table

Results summary

Results by round

Matches

Russian Cup

Round of 32

Knockout stage

Squad statistics

Appearances and goals

|-
|colspan="14"|Players away from the club on loan:
|-
|colspan="14"|Players who appeared for Arsenal Tula but left during the season:

|}

Goal scorers

Clean sheets

Disciplinary record

References

FC Arsenal Tula seasons
FC Arsenal Tula